The 2008 Korea Professional Baseball season was the 27th season in the history of the KBO League. The season commenced on March 29.

Season structure

Season format
 Regular Season: 126 games for each team
 Semiplayoff: Regular Season 3rd place vs. Regular Season 4th place - Best of 5
 Playoff: Regular Season 2nd place vs. Semiplayoff winner - Best of 7
 Korean Series: Regular Season 1st place vs. Playoff winner - Best of 7

Final standings
 Champion (1st place): Korean Series winner
 Runner-up (2nd place): Korean Series loser
 3rd–8th place: Sort by Regular Season record except teams to play in the Korean Series

Sponsorship change
Hyundai stopped their sponsorship after the 2007 season, and the Unicorns were renamed the Woori Heroes after Centennial Investments sold the naming rights to the Woori Tobacco Company.  They also announced possible player salary reductions.

Standings

Postseason

Semiplayoff
Samsung Lions win the series, 3–0

Playoff
Doosan Bears win the series, 4–2

Korean Series

SK Wyverns win the series, 4–1

Foreign hitters

Statistics

Team statistics

References

External links
  (Korean)
 Standings (Korean)

KBO League seasons
Korea Professional Baseball Season, 2008
Korea Professional Baseball season